As of December 2020, the International Union for Conservation of Nature (IUCN) lists 46 data deficient avian species. 0.47% of all evaluated avian species are listed as data deficient. 
No subpopulations of birds have been evaluated by the IUCN.

This is a complete list of data deficient avian species evaluated by the IUCN. Where possible common names for taxa are given while links point to the scientific name used by the IUCN.

Procellariiformes

Gruiformes

Owls

Passerines

Caprimulgiformes

Other bird species

See also 
 Lists of IUCN Red List data deficient species
 List of least concern birds
 List of near threatened birds
 List of vulnerable birds
 List of endangered birds
 List of critically endangered birds
 List of recently extinct birds

References 

Birds
Data deficient birds
Data deficient birds